Edwin Fabricio Castro Barros (born 21 February 1992), commonly known as Fabry, is a Colombian professional footballer who plays as a midfielder.

Club career
Born in Santa Bárbara, Santander, Fabry played youth football for Escuela Carlos Sarmiento Lora and Quilmes before being promoted to the reserve team in 2011. The following year he joined Deportivo Pasto, again assigned to the B-side.

Fabry made his first team debut on 13 February 2013, coming on as a late substitute in a 1–1 Copa Colombia away draw against Cortuluá. He scored his first goal as a senior on 8 May, netting the game's only in an away success over Universitario Popayán.

On 16 June 2014, Fabry signed for Brazilian Série C club Guarani, alongside compatriot Jhon Obregón. However, he only appeared twice for the club (both from the bench) before being released.

In January 2015, Fabry joined Spanish Tercera División side CF Rayo Majadahonda. After helping in their promotion to Segunda División B, he renewed with the club.

In February 2017, Fabry joined Swiss Challenge League club Servette FC.

In June 2018, Fabry joined Greek Superleague club PAS Giannina. In July 2021 Fabry left the club.

On 16 July 2021, Greek Super League club Apollon Smyrnis announced the signing of Fabry with a succinct announcement, without disclosing the terms or the duration of the contract, who is expected to be an ideal solution for the midfield, as a player with experience in Greece and as a player who had impressive performances with PAS Giannina during his three previous seasons.

Honours
PAS Giannina
 Super League Greece 2: 2019–20

References

External links

1992 births
Living people
Sportspeople from Santander Department
Colombian footballers
Association football midfielders
Categoría Primera A players
Deportivo Pasto footballers
Quilmes Atlético Club footballers
Campeonato Brasileiro Série C players
Guarani FC players
Segunda División B players
Tercera División players
CF Rayo Majadahonda players
Swiss Challenge League players
Servette FC players
PAS Giannina F.C. players
Apollon Smyrnis F.C. players

Colombian expatriate footballers
Colombian expatriate sportspeople in Argentina
Colombian expatriate sportspeople in Brazil
Colombian expatriate sportspeople in Spain
Expatriate footballers in Argentina
Expatriate footballers in Brazil
Expatriate footballers in Spain
Expatriate footballers in Switzerland
Expatriate footballers in Greece